Asian Pocket Billiard Federation (APBU) is the management of the Asian pocket billiards. Asian Pocket Billiard Union is headquartered in Taipei City, Taiwan.

APBU members
National affiliate members of APBU :

References

External links

Pool organizations